Elkport is a city in Clayton County, Iowa, United States. The population was 29 at the time of the 2020 census, down from 88 in 2000.

History
Elkport was laid out as a town in 1855. It was named from the Elk Creek.

The town was severely damaged by floods in May 2004. After the floods, all residents of the town chose federal buyout, selling their homes to the United States federal government for demolition. In September 2006, nearly all of the buildings of Elkport were demolished.

Demographics

As of the census of 2000, there were 88 people, 33 households, and 25 families residing in the city. The racial makeup of the city was 100.00% White.

There were 33 households, out of which 45.5% had children under the age of 18 living with them, 60.6% were married couples living together, 6.1% had a female householder with no husband present, and 24.2% were non-families. 24.2% of all households were made up of individuals, and 12.1% had someone living alone who was 65 years of age or older. The average household size was 2.67 and the average family size was 3.04.

In the city, the population was spread out, with 31.8% under the age of 18, 2.3% from 18 to 24, 28.4% from 25 to 44, 23.9% from 45 to 64, and 13.6% who were 65 years of age or older. The median age was 35 years. For every 100 females, there were 114.6 males. For every 100 females age 18 and over, there were 114.3 males.

The median income for a household in the city was $24,375, and the median income for a family was $28,125. Males had a median income of $23,750 versus $17,500 for females. The per capita income for the city was $11,518. There were 10.5% of families and 6.9% of the population living below the poverty line, including no under eighteens and 23.1% of those over 64.

Education
The municipality is within the boundary of the Central Community School District.

References 

Geography of Clayton County, Iowa
Cities in Iowa
1855 establishments in Iowa
Populated places established in 1855
Cities in Clayton County, Iowa